In ancient Roman myth and literature, Mors  is the personification of death equivalent to the Greek Thánatos. The Latin noun for "death", mors, genitive mortis, is of feminine gender, but surviving ancient Roman art  is not known to depict Death as a woman. Latin poets, however, are bound by the grammatical gender of the word. Horace writes of pallida Mors, "pale Death," who kicks her way into the hovels of the poor and the towers of kings equally. Seneca, for whom Mors is also pale, describes her "eager teeth." Tibullus pictures Mors as black or dark.

Mors is often represented allegorically in later Western literature and art, particularly during the Middle Ages. Depictions of the Crucifixion of Christ sometimes show Mors standing at the foot of the cross. Mors' antithesis is personified as Vita, "Life."

Roman mythology
In Latin literature, Mors is sometimes identified with the Roman gods Mars, god of war; Dīs Pater, god of the Roman underworld (later, also known as Pluto) and Orcus, god of death and punisher of perjurers. 

Mors is not immune to persuasion, resistance or trickery. In one story, Hercules fought Mors in order to save his friend's wife. In other stories, Mors serves Dis by ending the life of a person after the thread of his or her life has been cut by the Parcae, and of Mercury, messenger to the gods, escorting the dead person`s soul, or shade, down to the underworld's gate.

See also
 List of death deities
 Parca Maurtia or Morta, one of the Parcae
 Pluto

References

Death gods
Roman gods
Thanatos